Thor André Olsen (born 28 April 1964) is a Norwegian football coach and former goalkeeper. His last position was head coach in Mo IL.

Club career
Thor André Olsen played for Mo IL, Molde FK, SK Brann, Djurgårdens IF, Aalborg, IFK Norrköping and Lillestrøm SK.

In 1987, Olsen transferred to Molde. In 1988, newspaper VG named him player of the year in Norwegian football. In 1991, he went on to play for Brann where he played three seasons. Olsen then continued his career in Sweden, where he joined then second tier side Djurgården. In his first season at the club, he helped the team win promotion to Allsvenskan. In 1995, He received the Årets Järnkamin award from supporters club Järnkaminerna for his performances and values.

He retired from football in 2004.

International career
Thor André Olsen represented the Norway national under-21 team three times, debuting on 21 May 1985 against Sweden. In 1989 he played one game for Norway B against England B at Stavanger Stadion.

Coaching career
In 2001, he became playing goalkeeping coach in Mo IL. Between 2008 and 2010, he was coaching Stålkameratene, before returning to Mo where he was head coach until 2018.

Honours

Club 

 Djurgårdens IF 
 Division 1 Norra (1): 1994

Individual 
 Årets Järnkamin (1): 1995

References

Norwegian footballers
Norway under-21 international footballers
Norwegian expatriate footballers
Norwegian football managers
Eliteserien players
Allsvenskan players
Molde FK players
SK Brann players
Djurgårdens IF Fotboll players
AaB Fodbold players
IFK Norrköping players
Lillestrøm SK players
Expatriate footballers in Sweden
Expatriate men's footballers in Denmark
1964 births
Living people
Association football goalkeepers
People from Mo i Rana
Sportspeople from Nordland